Kaio Magno Bacelar Martins (born 13 August 1999), commonly known as Kaio Magno, is a Brazilian footballer who plays  as a striker.

Career statistics

Club

Notes

References

1999 births
Living people
Brazilian footballers
Association football forwards
CR Vasco da Gama players
Ceará Sporting Club players
Botafogo Futebol Clube (SP) players
People from Barra Mansa
2023 Madureira Esporte Clube